Sean or Shaun Maloney may refer to:

 Seán Maloney (Irish politician) (born 1945), Irish politician
 Sean Patrick Maloney (born 1966), American Democratic Party politician in New York state
 Sean Maloney (baseball) (born 1971), former American Major League Baseball pitcher
 Sean Maloney (technology), Intel executive
 Shaun Maloney (born 1983), Scottish footballer
 Shaun Maloney (labor activist) (1911–1999), American labor activist